

The Aviatika-900 Acrobat is a 1990s Russian single-seat aerobatic monoplane designed and built by Aviatika Joint Stock Company. The aircraft is sometimes referred to as the MAI-900 Acrobat, the Moscow Aviation Institute being one of the constitute organisations when the company was formed in 1993.

Design and development
The Acrobat is an all-metal monoplane with cantilever wings and a strut-braced tailplane. It has a fixed landing gear with a steerable tailwheel and is powered by a  AOOT M-14P radial piston engine.

Operational history
The aircraft set five FAI-accredited records. The aircraft was sold to Lithuanian aerobatic pilot Jurgis Kairys.

Specifications

See also

References

Notes

Bibliography

1990s Soviet and Russian sport aircraft
Single-engined tractor aircraft
Aerobatic aircraft
Aircraft first flown in 1993